"Sex on the Beach" is a song by Dutch Eurodance group T-Spoon. It was released as a single in July 1997 and found chart success in several countries, peaking at number one in Japan, number two in the United Kingdom and number three in the Netherlands. In some countries they had to change the song's title to "Fun on the Beach", because of censorship. In 2004, the song was released in a new version as "Sex on the Beach 2004". This version reached number 70 in the Netherlands.

Critical reception
Scottish newspaper Daily Record commented, "Is this a song about hypothermia or are we simply a nostalgic nation harking back to the nonexistent summer of sunshine?" They also compared it to Aqua's "Barbie Girl".

Chart performance
"Sex on the Beach" was successful on the charts in Europe, Japan and New Zealand, and remains the group's biggest hit to date. It reached number one in Japan and made it to the top 10 in Belgium, Ireland, the Netherlands, and the United Kingdom. In the latter nation, the single debuted at number two during its first week on the UK Singles Chart, on September 13, 1998. On the UK Indie Chart, it peaked at number one, and on the Eurochart Hot 100, it rose to number 16. Outside Europe, "Sex on the Beach" charted in both New Zealand and Australia, peaking at numbers six and 64, respectively. It earned a gold record in both New Zealand and the UK.

Music video
A music video was made for "Sex on the Beach", directed by Kenny Wisdom. It features the group partying with people on a beach.

Track listings

 7-inch single (US, 1999)
 "Sex on the Beach" (Radio Edit) – 3:42
 "Sex on the Beach" (Lectroluv Radio Mix) – 4:03

 12-inch single (Germany, 1997)
 "Sex on the Beach" (MIAMI Mix) – 4:11
 "Sex on the Beach" (IBIZA Radio mix) – 3:42
 "Sex on the Beach" (ORIGINAL Mix) – 3:52
 "Sex on the Beach" (Extended Original Edit) – 5:47

 CD single (Netherlands, 1997)
 "Sex on the Beach" (Ibiza Radio Mix) – 3:42
 "Sex on the Beach" (Original Mix) – 3:52

 CD maxi (Netherlands, 1997)
 "Sex on the Beach" (Ibiza Radio Mix) – 3:42
 "Sex on the Beach" (Original Mix) – 3:52
 "Sex on the Beach" (Summer Mix) – 4:11
 "Sex on the Beach" (Extended Original Edit) – 5:47

Charts

Weekly charts

Year-end charts

Certifications

Release history

References

1997 singles
1997 songs
550 Music singles
Daylight Records singles
Epic Records singles
Number-one singles in Japan
Songs about beaches
T-Spoon songs
UK Independent Singles Chart number-one singles